Westminster Live was a weekly television programme focusing on political developments within the Parliament of the United Kingdom. The programme began on 21 November 1989 on the same day as television cameras were first allowed into the House of Commons. The programme lasted until 20 December 2002 when it was discontinued, and succeeded by the Daily Politics.

The programme was presented by Nick Robinson and Iain Macwhirter. Robinson left the BBC to join ITV and Macwhirter went on to report on the Scottish Parliament in Holyrood Live.

The first presenter was Vivian White and later hosts included Nick Ross and Diana Madill.

The programme was originally presented from a small studio opposite the Houses of Parliament, but in later years it came from the BBC's nearby Millbank base.

It focused on coverage from Parliament far more than its successor.

See also
 Despatch Box
 This Week
 Daily Politics
 Holyrood Live

BBC Television shows
1989 British television series debuts
2002 British television series endings
1980s British political television series
1990s British political television series
2000s British political television series
English-language television shows